Miguel Ángel López Nicolás (born 3 July 1988 in Murcia) is a Spanish racewalker. He won the gold medal in the 20 km race walk at the 2015 World Championships and the silver in 2013. He competed in the 20 km walk at the 2012 Summer Olympics, where he placed fifth, and the 50 km walk at the 2016 Olympics.

Competition record

References

External links
 
 
 
 

1988 births
Living people
Spanish male racewalkers
Olympic athletes of Spain
Athletes (track and field) at the 2012 Summer Olympics
Athletes (track and field) at the 2016 Summer Olympics
Athletes (track and field) at the 2020 Summer Olympics
Sportspeople from Murcia
World Athletics Championships athletes for Spain
European Athletics Championships winners
World Athletics Championships winners